Rishivandiyam is a Village panchayat in Sankarapuram Taluk of Kallakurichi district in the state of Tamil Nadu, India. Rishivandhiyam is one of the 20 blocks of Kallakurichi, and has 43 panchayat villages in it.
 Elections and winners in the constituency are listed below.

Demographics 
Total population: 118,665Male: 59,905Female: 58,760

Vijayakanth emerged victorious from the Rishivandhiyam constituency in the 2011 state assembly elections. S. Sivaraj Mudaliyar who won four times in this constituency.

Co ordination and location 
Latitude: 11.817Longitude: 79.100UTM: KU90Geographical coordinates in decimal degrees (WGS84)

Cities and towns in Kallakurichi district